Carla Gugino (born August 29, 1971) is an American actress. After appearing in Troop Beverly Hills (1989) and This Boy's Life (1993), she received recognition for her starring roles as Ingrid Cortez in the Spy Kids trilogy (2001–2003), Rebecca Hutman in Night at the Museum (2006), Laurie Roberts in American Gangster (2007), Det. Karen Corelli in Righteous Kill (2008), Dr. Alex Friedman in Race to Witch Mountain (2009), Sally Jupiter in Watchmen (2009), Dr. Vera Gorski in Sucker Punch (2011), Amanda Popper in Mr. Popper's Penguins (2011), Emma Gaines in San Andreas (2015), and Jessie Burlingame in Gerald's Game (2017).

Gugino also starred as the lead character in the crime drama series Karen Sisco (2003),  the science fiction series Threshold (2005–2006), the supernatural horror series The Haunting of Hill House (2018), and the crime drama series Jett (2019), and also appeared in The Haunting of Bly Manor (2020).

Early life
Gugino was born in Sarasota, Florida, to Carl Gugino, an orthodontist of Italian descent, and a mother of English-Irish descent described as "Bohemian." Her parents separated when she was two, after which she travelled between her father and half-brother Carl Jr.'s home in Sarasota, and her Paradise, California, home, to which her mother moved her when she was four.

She has said of her upbringing, "I lived in a tepee in Northern California and a van in Big Sur. With my dad, I lived in a beautiful house with a swimming pool and a tennis court and went to Europe for the summers. So I feel like I lived two childhoods." She worked as a teenage fashion model, and took acting classes at the suggestion of her aunt, former Let's Make a Deal spokesmodel Carol Merrill. She eventually came to support herself, and with her parents' support, was legally emancipated by the time she was 16.

Career
Gugino's television work during the late 1980s and early 1990s included appearances on Good Morning, Miss Bliss, Saved by the Bell, Who's the Boss?, ALF, Doogie Howser, M.D., The Wonder Years, Webster and a recurring role on Falcon Crest. In film, Gugino appeared in the Shelley Long film Troop Beverly Hills (1989), and she co-starred with Pauly Shore in the romantic comedy Son in Law (1993). She appeared in the video to Bon Jovi's 1994 song "Always".

In 1995, Gugino appeared as Nan St. George (later the Duchess of Trevenick) with Greg Wise and James Frain in the BBC miniseries The Buccaneers, an adaptation of Edith Wharton's last novel. She played Ashley Schaeffer, Michael J. Fox's character's love interest, during the first season of the sitcom Spin City in 1996. She played opposite Nicolas Cage in Brian De Palma's Snake Eyes, and in Judas Kiss, which she also co-produced. She appeared as Dr. Gina Simon during the final season of the television medical drama Chicago Hope (1999–2000).

In 2001, she appeared as family matriarch Ingrid Cortez in the first Spy Kids film (as well as the film's two sequels in 2002 and 2003). That same year she appeared as Jet Li's love interest in the martial arts action thriller The One.

She starred in two short-lived TV series: ABC's Elmore Leonard crime drama Karen Sisco in 2003, and CBS' science fiction series Threshold in 2005. That same year, Gugino appeared as Lucille in the feature film adaptation of Frank Miller's graphic novel Sin City. The following year, she appeared in the film Night at the Museum as Ben Stiller's love interest.

Gugino performed in the Roundabout Theatre Company play After the Fall opposite Peter Krause. In late 2006, she appeared in an Off-Broadway production of Tennessee Williams' Suddenly Last Summer opposite Blythe Danner.

Gugino appeared as Amanda, Vincent Chase's agent, in a dozen episodes of the cable television series Entourage. Gugino appeared in the May 2007 issue of Allure. That same year she appeared in the action-horror film Rise: Blood Hunter and the feature film American Gangster. The following year, she played the female lead in the thriller Righteous Kill, opposite Robert De Niro and Al Pacino.

From January 17 to February 17, 2009, Gugino starred as Abby in Eugene O'Neill's Desire Under the Elms at the Goodman Theater in Chicago, Illinois. Charles Isherwood of The New York Times praised Gugino's performance, saying, "Ms. Gugino displays a depth and range of expression that I cannot imagine any other actress achieving with such blazing honesty and wrenching truth. She is simply magnificent." During the first three months of 2009, three feature films premiered featuring Gugino: the thriller The Unborn, the film Watchmen, in which she played Sally Jupiter, and the adventure remake Race to Witch Mountain, in which she starred opposite Dwayne Johnson. That April, she received an Outer Critics Circle Award nomination for Outstanding Actress in a Play for her performance in Desire Under the Elms. Later, in November of that year, she appeared as a pornographic actress in the comedy film Women in Trouble, which spawned a sequel in 2010, Elektra Luxx, titled after her character.

In 2011, Gugino appeared as Madame Vera Gorsky in Zack Snyder's action-fantasy film Sucker Punch alongside Abbie Cornish and Emily Browning. Gugino sang a duet with co-star Oscar Isaac, which appeared in the end credits and in the film's soundtrack. She also guest starred on the fourth season of Californication as Abby Rhodes, Hank Moody's attorney and love interest.

In mid-2012, Gugino had a lead role as Susan Berg, a Washington, D.C., investigative reporter, on the USA Network's miniseries Political Animals. In 2015, she had a lead role in the disaster film San Andreas, in which she once again starred opposite Dwayne Johnson.

Personal life
Since 1996, Gugino has been in a relationship with her collaborator, Sebastián Gutiérrez. Gugino stated in 2009 that they had no plans to marry, commenting, "Marriage isn't important for us. We like being boyfriend and girlfriend; there's something sexy and fun about that. We're very much about, 'There’s nothing holding us here other than our desire to be together.'"

Filmography

Film

Television

Music videos

Accolades
In 2009, Gugino was honored by the National Italian American Foundation (NIAF). During the Foundation's 34th Anniversary Gala in Washington, D.C., she received NIAF's Special Achievement Award for Entertainment, presented by her close friend, actress Connie Britton.

References

External links

 
 

1971 births
20th-century American actresses
21st-century American actresses
Actors from Sarasota, Florida
Actresses from California
Actresses from Florida
American film actresses
American people of English descent
American people of Irish descent
American people of Italian descent
American stage actresses
American television actresses
American voice actresses
Living people
People from Paradise, California
Theatre World Award winners